The Oberlerchner JOB 15 was an Austrian two-seat light aircraft produced by Josef Oberlerchner Holzindustrie, which had previously designed and built gliders.

Design and development
Using experience as sailplane designers and builders, Josef Oberlerchner Holzindustrie determined to create a powered aircraft. The result was the JOB 5, a two-seat side-by-side light aircraft of wooden construction. It first flew in 1958. The company decided to build a slightly larger three-seat production version, the JOB 15. The JOB 15 was a low-winged monoplane of composite construction with fixed tailwheel undercarriage, with a wooden wing and steel-tube fuselage covered in glass-reinforced plastic and fabric. The prototype first flew in 1960 with a 135 hp (101 kW) Avco Lycoming O-290-D2B engine. Three aircraft were built before the a more powerful version, the JOB 15-150, was built with a 150 hp (112 kW) Avco Lycoming O-320-A2B engine. After 11 15-150s had been built an improved version, the JOB 15-150/2, was introduced and ten were built before production ended in the late 1960s.

Variants
JOB 5
Prototype two-seater, 95 hp Continental C90-12F engine, one built
JOB 15
Production three-seater with a 135 hp (101 kW) Avco Lycoming O-290 engine, three built.
JOB 15-150
Re-engined version with a 150 hp (112 kw) Avco Lycoming O-320-A2B engine, 11 built.
JOB 15-150/2
Improved version, ten built.

Specifications (15-150)

References

External links

Schmidt, Pierre; Alpen-Klassike: Von der JOB 5 zur JOB 15, Modell Aviator, 2009. (German)

1960s Austrian civil utility aircraft
JOB15
Single-engined tractor aircraft
Glider tugs
Low-wing aircraft